Milks Grove Township is one of twenty-six townships in Iroquois County, Illinois, USA.  As of the 2010 census, its population was 214 and it contained 79 housing units.  Milks Grove Township formed from a portion of Chebanse Township on an unknown date, but before 1921.  Milks Grove is named for the late 19th-century midwestern land speculator Lemuel Milk.

Geography

Cemeteries
The township contains Milk's Grove Cemetery.

Airports and landing strips
 Berns Airport
 Porter Airport

Demographics

School districts
 Central Community Unit School District 4
 Herscher Community Unit School District 2

Political districts
 Illinois' 15th congressional district
 State House District 105
 State Senate District 53
 Iroquois County Board District 1

References
 
 United States Census Bureau 2007 TIGER/Line Shapefiles
 United States National Atlas

External links
 City-Data.com
 Illinois State Archives

Townships in Iroquois County, Illinois
Townships in Illinois